Dasnapur is a census town in Adilabad district of the Indian state of Andhra Pradesh.

Demographics 
 India census, Dasnapur had a population of 19,962. Males constitute 49% of the population and females 51%. Dasnapur has an average literacy rate of 58%, lower than the national average of 59.5%: male literacy is 68% and, female literacy is 48%. In Dasnapur, 14% of the population is under 6 years of age.

References 

Census towns in Adilabad district